Goniostemma punctatum is a species of plant in the family Apocynaceae. It is endemic to China. It grows in montane forests.

References

Flora of China
Secamonoideae
Critically endangered plants
Taxonomy articles created by Polbot